WRY, or wry, may refer to:

Arts and entertainment
 Gordon Wry (1910–1985), a Canadian tenor and conductor
 Scotch and Wry, a Scottish television comedy sketch show
 Wry, the battle cry made by Dio Brando in the JoJo's Bizarre Adventure series

Medicine
 Wry neck, a medical condition with an abnormal, asymmetrical head or neck position
 Wry nose, a medical condition with a deviation of the upper jaw and nose

Places
 WRY, the Chapman code for the West Riding of Yorkshire, UK
 WRY, the IATA code for Westray Airport on Orkney, Scotland, UK
 WRY, the National Rail code for Wraysbury railway station in Berkshire, UK

See also

 Work (disambiguation)